Magog is a city in southeastern Quebec, Canada, about  east of Montreal at the confluence of Lake Memphremagog—after which the city was named—with the Rivière aux Cerises and the Magog River. It is a major centre and industrial city in the Regional County Municipality of Memphremagog. The city lies in the Eastern Townships tourist region.

In 2002 the City of Magog was merged with the Township of Magog and the Village of Omerville as part of the municipal reorganization in Quebec.

Etymology
"Memphremagog" comes from the Abenaki word  mamhlawbagak, which means "large expanse of water" or "vast lake." "Magog" is believed to be a truncation of the lake's name. However, it could also come from namagok and namagwôttik, which means "the lake where there is brook trout." Others have theorised that the name has Biblical origins in Gog and Magog, or that it refers to an ancient city by the same name.

History

The Abenaki were the first to inhabit the region and had long visited the Memphremagog and its waterways. The town was founded in 1776, when Loyalists emigrated from nearby Vermont. They called it The Outlet, referring to the flow of water emptying into the Magog River from the lake.

Ralph Merry, who is considered the founder of Magog, was an American Revolutionary who immigrated to Lower Canada in 1799 and settled in Bolton, to the west of the lake. He bought up all the neighboring lots, including the village of Magog, where he went on to act as its mayor, judge, and developer. In 1821, he built a house there, which is the oldest standing house in the city.

It was formally named Magog in 1855.

At the end of the 19th century and throughout the 20th, the city's economy was dominated by the textile industry, most notably by a cotton mill operated by Dominion Textile. It wasn only in the 1960s and the 1970s that the city's economy would achieve desperately needed diversification via tourism, services, and the development of the industrial park.

In 2002 the City of Magog was merged with the Township of Magog and the Village of Omerville as part of the municipal reorganization in Quebec.

Notable people
Rouville Beaudry, Quebec nationalism activist who served in the Legislative Assembly of Quebec
Pierre Bélanger, volleyball player who competed in the 1976 Olympics
Nicolas Boulay, Canadian Football League player
Reginald W. Buzzell, U.S. Army brigadier general, born in Magog
Sonia Vachon, actress

Geography
The city of Magog is also in close proximity, 35 km (21.8 mi), to the Derby Line–Stanstead border crossing station at the Canada-United States border.

Climate

Demographics 

Population trend:

(+) Merged with the Township of Magog and the Village of Omerville on October 9, 2002.

Mother tongue (2011)

Economy

The city is the economic core of the Regional County Municipality of Memphremagog.

Industry
For several generations it was a one-industry (textile) manufacturing town, where Textile made linen ware produces. The main plant is still there but has considerably reduced its activities to a few employees mainly making pillows.

Tourism
Magog is in a resort area, with shops and services catering to vacationers and tourists. Tourism is related to the lake and the nearby Mount Orford.

See also
 List of cities in Quebec
 2002 Magog municipal election

References

External links

 
Cities and towns in Quebec